Hahns Peak is a summit in Routt County, Colorado, in the United States.

Hahns Peak was named after Joseph Hahn, a gold miner who, with companions William Doyle and George Wray came to the area in the 1860s. Hahns Peak Village is named after the peak. An old lookout tower remains on the peak's summit.  After falling into disrepair, it was restored in the summer of 2016 and 2017.

References

Landforms of Routt County, Colorado
Mountains of Colorado
North American 3000 m summits